The Last Tour is a world tour by the bachata group Aventura to promote their final studio album The Last before their split. The Last Tour started on July 31, 2009 and ended on March 7, 2011. It was their last tour as a group, until their 2016 residency and 2020 Inmortal Tour of US arenas.

The Last Tour was the band's most successful tour and the longest. It broke attendance records in Latin America, including 60,000 fans in Santo Domingo at Estadio Olímpico Félix Sánchez.

In the United States the tour was a success. In an article, Billboard stated that in the United States Aventura's 2009-10 shows averaged $675,000 and 9,358 tickets per show. In 2010, Billboard named it the top Latin tour of 2010 with a total gross of US$18.1 million over 27 shows with 15 sellouts and 253,777 attendance. The tour also broke the record of the most consecutive sold-out concerts in Madison Square Garden by a Latin artist.

Tour dates

Box office data

Notes

References 

Aventura (band)
2009 concert tours
2010 concert tours